Ammochloa is a genus of Mediterranean plants in the grass family, Poaceae.

 Species
 Ammochloa involucrata Murb. - Morocco
 Ammochloa palaestina Boiss. - Spain, Morocco, Algeria, Tunisia, Libya, Egypt, Palestine, Israel, Jordan, Lebanon, Syria, Turkey, Caucasus, Iraq, Iran, Kuwait
 Ammochloa pungens (Schreb.) Boiss. - Morocco, Algeria, Canary Islands

See also 
 List of Poaceae genera

References 

Pooideae
Poaceae genera
Taxa named by Pierre Edmond Boissier